Ricardo Lobo (リカルド・ロボ | born May 20, 1984) is a Brazilian football striker who plays for Cascavel.

On January 14, 2010 Ricardo Lobo transferred to Tochigi S.C. in J. League Division 2. In January 2015, he re-signed for Cypriot club Doxa Katokopias.

Club statistics
.

References

External links

Profile at Tochigi SC

 

1984 births
Living people
Brazilian footballers
Guarani FC players
Criciúma Esporte Clube players
Brazilian expatriate footballers
Expatriate footballers in Japan
Expatriate footballers in Cyprus
Cypriot First Division players
J1 League players
J2 League players
J3 League players
Tochigi SC players
Kashiwa Reysol players
JEF United Chiba players
Doxa Katokopias FC players
Brusque Futebol Clube players
Ehime FC players
Association football forwards
Sportspeople from Campinas